The 2019–20 James Madison Dukes men's basketball team represented James Madison University during the 2019–20 NCAA Division I men's basketball season. The Dukes, led by fourth-year head coach Louis Rowe, played their home games at the James Madison University Convocation Center in Harrisonburg, Virginia as members of the Colonial Athletic Association. They finished the season 9–21, 2–16 in CAA play to finish in last place. They lost in the first round of the CAA tournament to Elon.

On March 9, 2020, the school announced that head coach Louis Rowe would not return as head coach for the Dukes. A few weeks later, the school named Georgia Southern head coach Mark Byington the Dukes' new head coach.

This was the final season the Dukes would play their home games in the JMU Convocation Center as the new Atlantic Union Bank Center will be their new home for the 2020–21 season.

Previous season 
The Dukes finished the 2018–19 season 14–19, 6–12 in CAA play to finish in a tie for eighth place. They defeated in the first round of the CAA tournament to Towson before losing to Hosftra in the quarterfinals.

Departures

Recruiting class of 2019

Roster

Schedule and results

|-
!colspan=9 style=| Non-conference regular season

|-
!colspan=9 style=| CAA regular season

|-
!colspan=9 style=| CAA tournament
|-

Source:

References

James Madison Dukes men's basketball seasons
James Madison
James Madison
James Madison